Gunnar Arnesen (30 October 1927 – 30 May 2009) was a Norwegian footballer. He played in two matches for the Norway national football team from 1954 to 1959.

References

External links
 
 

1927 births
2009 deaths
Norwegian footballers
Norway international footballers
Association football forwards
Lillestrøm SK players